This is the list of companies that manufacture cement in Zimbabwe.

 Sino-Zimbabwe Cement Company
 Lafarge Cement Zimbabwe Limited 
 PPC Zimbabwe Limited
 Mortal Investments Manufacturing Company 
 Pacstar Cement & Concrete Limited

Production
, Zimbabwe cement manufacturers had installed capacity of approximately 2,000,000 tonnes of cement annually, with the leading two manufacturers, PPC Zimbabwe and Lafarge Cement Zimbabwe Limited being responsible for more than 70 percent of production. In September 2018, Zimbabwe's cement consumption was estimated at 1.3 million tonnes annually.

Marketsharing

The table below illustrates the rankings of Zimbabwe's manufacturers, based on projected annual production figures.

See also
List of cement manufacturers in Rwanda
List of cement manufacturers in Tanzania
List of companies and cities in Africa that manufacture cement

References

External links
Zimbabwe cement producers seek tariffs on imports

Cement companies of Zimbabwe
Cement manufacturers

Manufacturing in Zimbabwe
Zimbabwe